Spelter is a census-designated place (CDP) in Harrison County, West Virginia, United States. Spelter has a post office with ZIP code 26438. As of the 2010 census, its population was 346.

An early variant name was Ziesing.

References

Census-designated places in Harrison County, West Virginia